The 1967 New Jersey State Senate elections were held on November 7, 1967.

The elections took place midway through Governor Richard J. Hughes's second term and resulted in a historic landslide for the Republican Party. The new state legislative map still elected most Senators county-wide, allowing Republicans to gain a large majority by sweeping every county except Mercer, Middlesex, and Hudson.

Background

Reapportioning 

Until 1965, the New Jersey State Senate was composed of 21 senators with each county electing one senator. After the U.S. Supreme Court decision Reynolds v. Sims required legislative districts to be approximately equal in population (a principle known as "one man, one vote"), New Jersey entered a decade-long period of reapportioning. In 1965, the Senate was increased to 29 members, with larger counties given multiple seats and some smaller counties sharing one or two senators.

For the 1967 election, the map was entirely redone. The 1967 Districts were organized by the 1966 New Jersey Constitutional Convention. The specific Assembly districts (used for the election Senator in multi-County multi-Senator Districts) were drawn by the New Jersey Apportionment Commission. Eleven new seats were added and county lines were generally followed (11 single county districts and 2 multi-county single senator districts). As a result of a New Jersey Supreme Court decision, several existing districts were split up into districts smaller than a single county. This was contrary to apportionment scheme in the New Jersey Constitution, following the 1966 New Jersey Constitutional Convention and popular ratification.

 Mercer, Middlesex, Union, Hudson, Bergen, and Passaic counties gained one seat each.
 Essex County gained two seats.
 Atlantic, Cape May, Camden, Cumberland, Gloucester, and Salem counties gained one combined seat for a total of six.
 Burlington, Monmouth, and Ocean counties gained one combined seat for a total of four.
 Hunterdon, Morris, Somerset, Sussex, and Warren counties gained one combined seat for a total of five.

Incumbents not running for re-election

Republican 
 Frederick J. Scholz (District 3)
 Nelson Stamler (District 9)

Summary of results by State Senate District

District 1

District 2

District 3

District 3A

District 3B

District 3C

District 3D

District 4

District 4A

District 4B

District 5

District 6

District 7

District 8

District 9

District 10

District 11

District 12

District 13

District 14

District 15

References 

1967 New Jersey elections
New Jersey
1967